Competitors from Russia in the Team Speedway Polish Championship 

(names in alphabetical order)

Russian speedway riders